Alessandra Barros (born January 3, 1979, in Brasília) is a Brazilian curler. She currently plays second for the Vancouver, British Columbia-based National Brazilian team.

Teams

Women's

Mixed

Mixed doubles

Personal life
Barros resides in Vancouver, British Columbia, Canada.

References

External links
 
 Alessandra Barros | Confederacao Brasileira de Deportos No Gelo 
 

1979 births
Living people
Sportspeople from Brasília
Brazilian female curlers
Curlers from Vancouver